Din Yero Thomas (born September 28, 1976) is an American former mixed martial artist who was featured on The Ultimate Fighter 4: The Comeback. In the Ultimate Fighting Championship, Thomas is a UFC 41 Lightweight Tournament Semifinalist. He holds a Black belt in Brazilian Jiu-Jitsu under Ricardo Liborio and currently runs two successful Brazilian Jiu-Jitsu and MMA academies in Port St. Lucie, Florida. Thomas holds notable victories of (UFC Lightweight Champion) Jens Pulver, (UFC Welterweight Champion) Matt Serra, and (Strikeforce Lightweight Champion) Clay Guida.

Thomas has acted in local independent films, portraying The Fight Kid in Chris Fuller's Loren Cass and Reverend Pierce in Natalie, Queen of Scots. He appeared alongside Dana White and former opponent Matt Serra on Dana White: Lookin' for a Fight, and currently is a cast member of the UFC Live Weigh-in Show.

Background 
Thomas was born in Wilmington, Delaware, where he lived until he was 12 years old. When he was 12 Thomas moved to Port St. Lucie, Florida, and attended Port St. Lucie High School. Thomas flirted with baseball and football growing up, but ultimately did not have a serious interest in team sports because he did not like negatively affecting his teammates. A few weeks before his 18th birthday, Thomas' life changed drastically. He had recently broken up with his girlfriend, and in a fit of rage beat up her new boyfriend at her house. The young Thomas was charged with battery and had to spend his weekends in prison for the next year. Soon, he turned his attention to jiu-jitsu and began training in a small academy near his home.

Mixed martial arts career 
Before entering the UFC, Thomas held a 12–1 MMA record including wins over future UFC lightweight champion Jens Pulver and Dokonjonosuke Mishima, with his only loss coming to future UFC lightweight title challenger Caol Uno. Thomas made his UFC debut at UFC 32, in a fight against future UFC Lightweight and Welterweight champion B.J. Penn, where he lost by TKO (strikes) in the first round. Thomas returned at UFC 33, defeating Fabiano Iha by unanimous decision.

At UFC 39, Thomas faced Japanese superstar Caol Uno in a rematch. The fight was part of a tournament to determine the new UFC Lightweight Champion. After three rounds, Thomas lost by unanimous decision. His next fight was a split decision victory over future UFC welterweight champion Matt Serra at UFC 41. This fight would prove somewhat controversial, due to one of the judges mistakenly placing the score he assigned to Thomas in the column reserved for Serra. This caused Serra to be declared the winner by decision, but the mistake was discovered and Thomas and his team were notified of the change, giving Thomas the split decision victory. This would be Thomas' last UFC fight for 3 years.

Thomas was a contestant on The Ultimate Fighter 4 where he defeated Mikey Burnett in the first round, before losing to training partner Chris Lytle by decision in the semi-finals. Thomas returned at the finale on November 11, 2006, to face Rich Clementi, winning via rear naked choke in the second round.

Thomas was then defeated via submission (rear naked choke) by future UFC lightweight title challenger Kenny Florian after injuring his knee in a takedown attempt while headlining the main event at UFC Fight Night 11. Doctors said in his takedown attempt that Thomas tore his meniscus and stretched his PCL. His most recent UFC fight was a unanimous decision loss to Josh Neer at UFC Fight Night 13. He was released from his UFC contract after this fight.

After his loss to Neer, Thomas decided to drop a weight class to featherweight (145 lbs). He debuted at featherweight against Dustin Pieken securing a triangle choke in the first round. He has followed that up with TKO wins over Gabe Lemley and Dustin Pague.

Thomas had signed with Shine Fights and was expected to make his debut against Ricardo Mayorga on May 15 in Fayetteville, North Carolina but it was canceled after Don King was granted an injunction preventing Mayorga from fighting.

Thomas was scheduled to return after a nearly two-year-long layoff October 7, 2011, at Fight Time 7 in Fort Lauderdale, Florida, a promotion headed up by his American Top Team boxing trainer, Howard Davis Jr. But Thomas was in a car accident prior to the event and had to be hospitalized for his injuries. His fight against George Sheppard was scheduled to be the main event of Fight Time 7: The Return of Din Thomas.

On January 2, 2014, Thomas announced his retirement from mixed martial arts.

Coaching career
Besides his own professional mixed martial artist career, Thomas has been coaching since the early days of MMA. He started coaching at Mike Metzger's Internal Power Karate School in 1999. Thomas owned multiple MMA and jiu-jitsu schools until he was recruited to become one of the primary coaches at American Top Team in 2015. Before becoming a full-time coach at ATT, he had been partially affiliated with the team and its athletes since 2001. In March 2020, Thomas announced that he had departed from ATT in order to pursue his own MMA camp.

Personal life 
Thomas is married and has a son named Ethon.

He also appeared in the 2007 Gotham Award-nominated independent feature film Loren Cass which had its United States premiere at Dennis Hopper's CineVegas Film Festival and its international premiere in the prestigious Filmmakers of the Present competition at the Locarno International Film Festival in Switzerland. The film was released in theaters and on DVD in 2009 by Kino International.

Thomas was arrested on October 30, 2007, on a charge of "felony prohibited competitions" in Port St. Lucie, Florida at his training gym. As of November 30, 2007, the Assistant State Attorney's office decided not to file formal charges against Thomas and filed paperwork dismissing the charge on which he was arrested. The Assistant D.A. stated if the fighter or participants were students of Thomas' school, and the purpose of the school is to teach martial arts, then they meet the exception to the law.

Championships and accomplishments

Mixed martial arts
Ultimate Fighting Championship
UFC 41 Lightweight Tournament Semifinalist
Fight of the Night (One time) vs. Clay Guida
Submission of the Night (One time) vs. Jeremy Stephens
World Extreme Fighting
World Extreme Fighting Lightweight Championship (Three times)
Reality Super Fighting
Reality Super Fighting Lightweight Championship (Two times)
International Sport Combat Federation
ISCF World Lightweight Championship (One time)

Mixed martial arts record 

|-
| Loss
| align=center| 26–9 (1)
| Georgi Karakhanyan
| Decision (unanimous)
| Legacy Fighting Championship 19
| 
| align=center| 3
| align=center| 5:00
| Texas, United States
| 
|-
| NC
| align=center| 26–8 (1)
| Cody Bollinger
| No Contest
| Pure MMA: Next Episode
| 
| align=center| 1
| align=center| 2:04
| Wilkes Barre, Pennsylvania, United States
| 
|-
| Win
| align=center| 26–8
| Dustin Pague
| TKO (doctor stoppage)
| WEF: Brasco vs. Whitesel
| 
| align=center| 2
| align=center| 4:14
| Pittsburgh, Pennsylvania, United States
| 
|-
| Win
| align=center| 25–8
| Gabe Lemley
| TKO (knee)
| SRP: March Badness
| 
| align=center| 1
| align=center| 4:13
| Pensacola, Florida, United States
| 
|-
| Win
| align=center| 24–8
| Dustin Pieken
| Submission (triangle choke)
| HHP 1: The Patriot Act
| 
| align=center| 1
| align=center| 2:58
| Columbia, Missouri, United States
| 
|-
| Loss
| align=center| 23–8
| Josh Neer
| Decision (unanimous)
| UFC Fight Night 13
| 
| align=center| 3
| align=center| 5:00
| Broomfield, Colorado, United States
| 
|-
| Loss
| align=center| 23–7
| Kenny Florian
| Submission (rear-naked choke)
| UFC Fight Night 11
| 
| align=center| 1
| align=center| 4:30
| Las Vegas, Nevada, United States
| 
|-
| Win
| align=center| 23–6
| Jeremy Stephens
| Submission (armbar)
| UFC 71
| 
| align=center| 2
| align=center| 2:44
| Las Vegas, Nevada, United States
| Submission of the Night
|-
| Win
| align=center| 22–6
| Clay Guida
| Decision (unanimous)
| UFC Fight Night 8
| 
| align=center| 3
| align=center| 5:00
| Hollywood, Florida, United States
| Fight of the Night
|-
| Win
| align=center| 21–6
| Rich Clementi
| Submission (rear-naked choke)
| The Ultimate Fighter 4 Finale
| 
| align=center| 2
| align=center| 3:11
| Las Vegas, Nevada, United States
| 
|-
| Loss
| align=center| 20–6
| Luciano Azevedo
| Decision (unanimous)
| WCFC: No Guts No Glory
| 
| align=center| 3
| align=center| 5:00
| Manchester, England
| 
|-
| Win
| align=center| 20–5
| Dwayne Shelton
| Submission (armbar)
| BP: Pride & Glory
| 
| align=center| 1
| align=center| N/A
| Georgia, United States
| 
|-
| Loss
| align=center| 19–5
| Tyrone Glover
| Decision (majority)
| Deep: 20th Impact
| 
| align=center| 3
| align=center| 5:00
| Tokyo, Japan
| 
|-
| Win
| align=center| 19–4
| John Strawn
| Submission (armbar)
| Absolute Fighting Championships 11
| 
| align=center| 1
| align=center| 1:15
| Fort Lauderdale, Florida, United States
| 
|-
| Win
| align=center| 18–4
| Ray Totorico
| Submission (ankle lock)
| Battle of New Orleans 11
| 
| align=center| 1
| align=center| 1:45
| Metairie, Louisiana, United States
| 
|-
| Loss
| align=center| 17–4
| Amar Suloev
| TKO (punches and soccer kicks)
| Inoki Bom-Ba-Ye 2003
| 
| align=center| 1
| align=center| 4:22
| Kobe, Japan
| 
|-
| Win
| align=center| 17–3
| Steve Berger
| Decision (unanimous)
| Absolute Fighting Championships 4
| 
| align=center| 3
| align=center| 5:00
| Fort Lauderdale, Florida, United States
| 
|-
| Win
| align=center| 16–3
| Matt Serra
| Decision (split)
| UFC 41
| 
| align=center| 3
| align=center| 5:00
| Atlantic City, New Jersey, United States
| 
|-
| Loss
| align=center| 15–3
| Caol Uno
| Decision (unanimous)
| UFC 39
| 
| align=center| 3
| align=center| 5:00
| Uncasville, Connecticut, United States
| 
|-
| Win
| align=center| 15–2
| Rob Baer
| TKO (punches)
| RSF 6: Mayhem in Myers
| 
| align=center| 1
| align=center| 1:22
| Fort Myers, Florida, United States
| 
|-
| Win
| align=center| 14–2
| Jason Bender
| TKO (punches)
| RSF 5: New Blood Conflict
| 
| align=center| 1
| align=center| 1:03
| Augusta, Georgia, United States
| 
|-
| Win
| align=center| 13–2
| Fabiano Iha
| Decision (unanimous)
| UFC 33
| 
| align=center| 3
| align=center| 5:00
| Las Vegas, Nevada, United States
| 
|-
| Loss
| align=center| 12–2
| B.J. Penn
| KO (knee and punches)
| UFC 32
| 
| align=center| 1
| align=center| 2:42
| East Rutherford, New Jersey, United States
| 
|-
| Win
| align=center| 12–1
| Scott Johnson
| Submission (armbar)
| RSF 1: Redemption in the Valley
| 
| align=center| 1
| align=center| 3:11
| Wheeling, West Virginia, United States
| 
|-
| Win
| align=center| 11–1
| Stephen Palling
| Submission (triangle choke)
| SuperBrawl 20
| 
| align=center| 1
| align=center| 3:52
| Honolulu, Hawaii, United States
| 
|-
| Win
| align=center| 10–1
| Jens Pulver
| Submission (heel hook)
| WEF: New Blood Conflict
| 
| align=center| 2
| align=center| 0:33
| United States
| 
|-
| Win
| align=center| 9–1
| Don Banville
| TKO (corner stoppage)
| World Extreme Fighting 9: World Class
| 
| align=center| 2
| align=center| 4:00
| Evansville, Indiana, United States
| 
|-
| Win
| align=center| 8–1
| Dokonjonosuke Mishima
| TKO (doctor stoppage)
| Shooto – R.E.A.D. 2
| 
| align=center| 2
| align=center| 3:37
| Tokyo, Japan
| 
|-
| Win
| align=center| 7–1
| Tim Douglas
| Submission (armbar)
| Reality Combat Fighting 4
| 
| align=center| 1
| align=center| 0:45
| Houma, Louisiana, United States
| 
|-
| Win
| align=center| 6–1
| Ken Allen
| Technical Submission (guillotine choke)
| World Extreme Fighting 7: Stomp in the Swamp
| 
| align=center| 1
| align=center| 3:16
| Kenner, Louisiana, United States
| 
|-
| Loss
| align=center| 5–1
| Caol Uno
| Submission (rear-naked choke)
| Shooto: Renaxis 4
| 
| align=center| 3
| align=center| 3:16
| Tokyo, Japan
| 
|-
| Win
| align=center| 5–0
| Scott Bills
| Submission (triangle choke)
| World Extreme Fighting 5
| 
| align=center| 1
| align=center| 3:46
| United States
| 
|-
| Win
| align=center| 4–0
| Scott Bills
| TKO (retirement)
| World Extreme Fighting 4
| 
| align=center| 1
| align=center| 5:00
| United States
| 
|-
| Win
| align=center| 3–0
| Ed Lutz
| Submission (rear-naked choke)
| World Extreme Fighting 4
| 
| align=center| 1
| align=center| 3:20
| United States
| 
|-
| Win
| align=center| 2–0
| Rodney Brown
| Submission (keylock)
| Ybor Vale Tudo
| 
| align=center| 1
| align=center| 4:00
| Tampa, Florida, United States
| 
|-
| Win
| align=center| 1–0
| Tomas Velazquez
| Submission (armbar)
| WVF: Jacksonville Vale Tudo 1
| 
| align=center| 1
| align=center| 1:02
| Jacksonville, Florida, United States
|

Notes and references

External links
 Official Site
 
 
 November 2006 Interview

Living people
People from Wilmington, Delaware
American male mixed martial artists
Mixed martial artists from Delaware
American practitioners of Brazilian jiu-jitsu
People awarded a black belt in Brazilian jiu-jitsu
1976 births
Sportspeople from Wilmington, Delaware
Featherweight mixed martial artists
Lightweight mixed martial artists
Mixed martial artists utilizing Brazilian jiu-jitsu
African-American mixed martial artists
Ultimate Fighting Championship male fighters
21st-century African-American sportspeople
20th-century African-American sportspeople